Spring, Summer, Autumn, Winter is a Mandarin album by Hins Cheung, and was released on March 23, 2006.

The tracks on the album are:

CD
 過雲雨 (Rain of Passing Cloud)
 Hurt So Bad - Theme from Movie 'Moments of Love'
 有一首歌 (There's a Song)
 分手前的雨天 (The Rainy Day Before Breaking Up)
 雲裡的月光 (Moonlight in the Cloud)
 随你 (Up to You)
 如果我 (If I)
 偷故事的人 (Story Stealer)
 絕頂愛情 Duet With Father (Absolute Love)

Hins Cheung albums
2006 albums
Universal Records albums
Mandopop albums